Divide and Dissolve is an instrumental Doom metal band based in Melbourne, Australia.

Divide and Dissolve is made up of saxophone and guitarist Takiaya Reed, who is of Tsalagi and African-American heritage, and percussionist Sylvie Nehill who is of Māori and White-Australian heritage.

Following two albums released by Australian record label Dero Arcade, the bands third album Gas Lit was released on vinyl and CD by English-based Invada Records in 2021, following a digital release in 2020. The album was produced by Unknown Mortal Orchestra’s Ruban Nielson.

In 2018 their music video for Resistance was removed from YouTube after it was criticised by a number of politicians and media outlets. It featured them spitting and spraying urine-coloured water on monuments of colonial figures like Captain James Cook and John Batman. The video was then reinstated, with YouTube apologising for the removal, stating, "When it’s brought to our attention that a video has been removed mistakenly, we act quickly to reinstate it."

While the bands songs are primarily instrumental, their song titles are often highly political and in interviews they have referenced their wish for their music to "decolonising, decentralising, disestablishing, and destroying white supremacy."

Discography

Albums

Awards and nominations

Music Victoria Awards
The Music Victoria Awards are an annual awards night celebrating Victorian music. They commenced in 2006.

! 
|-
| 2017
| Basic
| Best Heavy Album
| 
|rowspan="2"|  
|-
| 2018
| Abomination 
| Best Rock/Punk Album
| 
|-
| 2021
| Divide and Dissolve
| Best Heavy Act
| 
| 
|-

References

External links 
 Divide and Dissolve on Discogs

Australian heavy metal musical groups
Musical groups from Melbourne
Musical groups established in 2015